WVSZ (107.3 FM) is a radio station broadcasting a country music format. Licensed to Chesterfield, South Carolina, United States, the station is currently owned by Our Three Sons Broadcasting, LLP and features programming from ABC Radio .

References

External links

VSZ
Country radio stations in the United States